= Steven Meese =

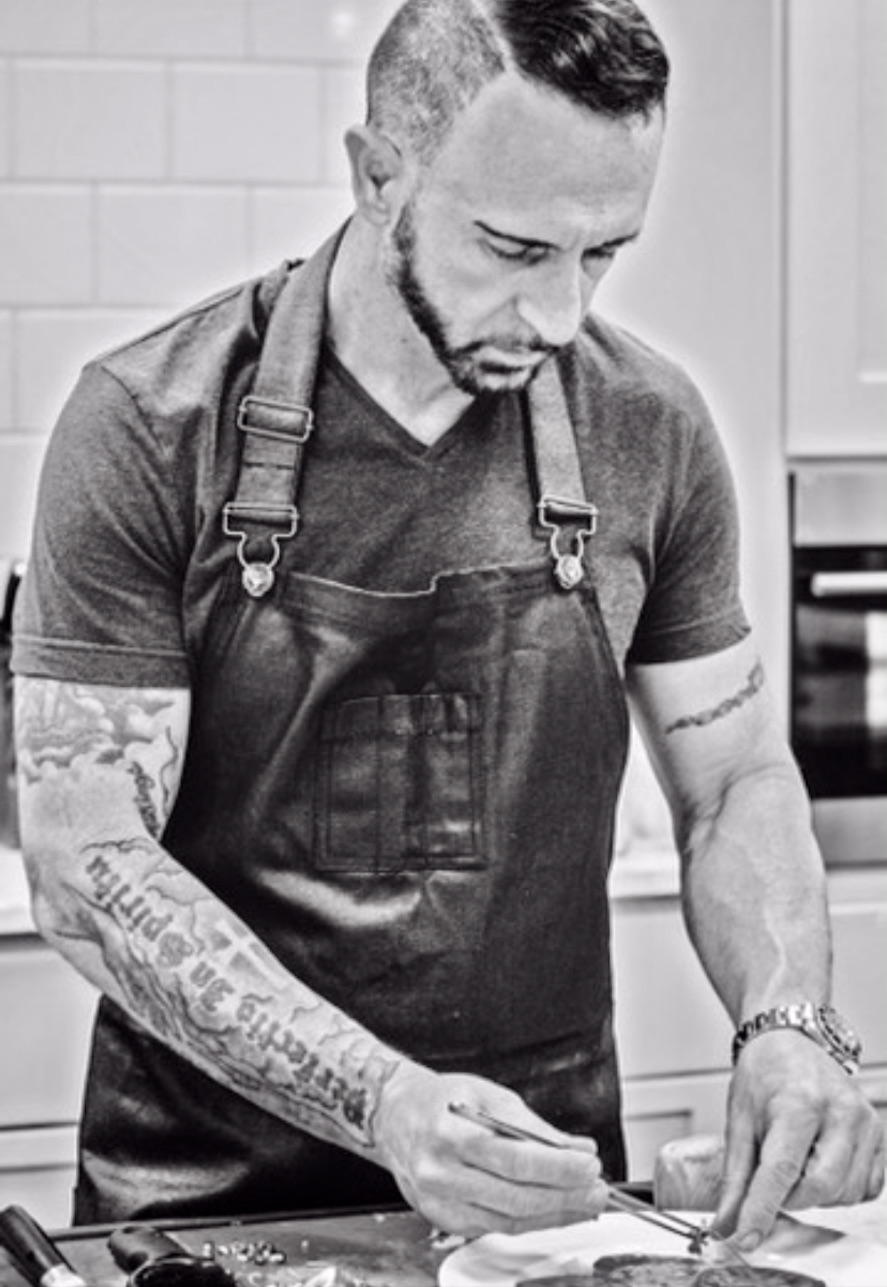
- Meese at Jean Georges Marigold, Charlottesville, Virginia, Keswick Hall
- Born: Ioannina, Greece
- Occupation: Chef

Steven Meese is an American chef and television personality best known as the creator, host and producer of the PBS series, "A Chef's Journey."

== Early life ==
Meese was born in Ioannina, Greece. He spent his childhood in Daytona Beach, Florida, until the mid 1970s. He was inspired to begin cooking by his Greek family. Meese also had the opportunity to play in the English Premier League and train as a professional soccer player before his attention turned back to the kitchen.

== Career ==
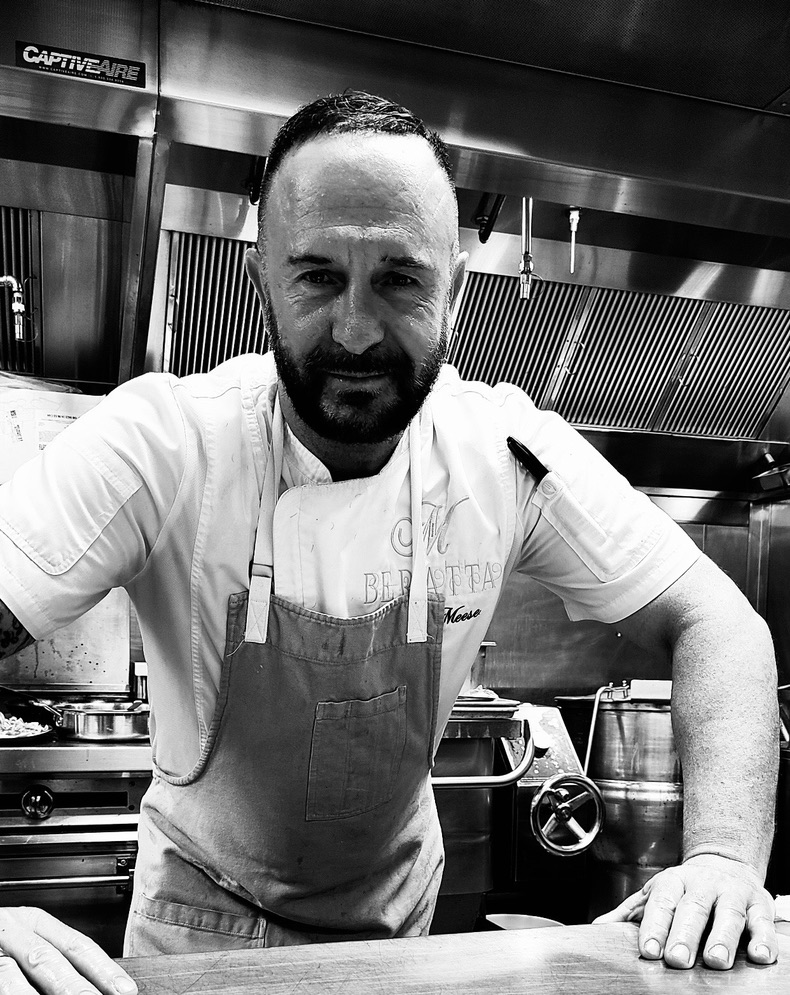
Meese

In 1995, Meese was accepted at the Disney Culinary Academy. He apprenticed under three-star Michelin chefs and was taught by Darryl Mickler, German chef Reimund Pitz, and Michael LaDuke. He traveled around the country learning his technique.

Meese is known for his avant-garde Mediterranean style of cuisine. He writes about his food in the column, "Best Dish Forward" and a blog on his website. His PBS series A Chef's Journey aired on selective Midwest PBS stations from 2014 to 2016. In the series, Meese interviewed and cooked with chefs including John Currence of City Grocery, Anthony Lamas of Seviche and Ryan McCaskey of Acadia.

Meese is an ambassador for the charities No Kid Hungry, St. Jude's Children's Hospital and Charity: Water. In 2017, he was part of Chef's Table Austin, a fundraiser for Water to Thrive.
